Agrotis lasserrei is a moth of the family Noctuidae. It is widespread throughout most of the eremic zone of the Palearctic realm, from south-east Spain and the western part of the Sahara to Turkmenistan and Iran.

Adults are on wing from October to November. There is one generation per year.

External links
 Noctuinae of Israel

Agrotis
Palearctic Lepidoptera
Moths described in 1881